The Democratic Revolutionary Front–New Alternative (Spanish: Frente Democrático Revolucionario – Nueva Alternativa, FDR-NA) was a right-centrist electoral political alliance in Bolivia.

The FDR-NA was formed in Spring 1980 by:
 Christian Democratic Party, PDC;
 Alliance of the National Left, ALIN;
 Socialist Party-Guillermo Aponte Burela, PS-Aponte;
 Offensive of the Democratic Left, OID;
 Revolutionary Workers Party Trotskyist-Posadist, POR-TP.

In the 1980 general elections the FDR-NA presented as its presidential candidate Luis Adolfo Siles Salinas (OID) and Benjamín Miguel Harb (PDC) as vice-presidential candidate.

Notes

1980 establishments in Bolivia
Defunct political party alliances in Bolivia
Political parties established in 1980
Political parties with year of disestablishment missing